Chotynin  is a village in the administrative district of Gmina Bolesławiec, within Wieruszów County, Łódź Voivodeship, in central Poland. The village has a population of 300.

References

Chotynin
Kalisz Governorate